Several ships of the Argentine Republic Navy have been named Almirante Brown, General Brown, or Brown after William Brown (1777–1857), father of the Argentine Navy.

 , a buccaneer sail ship
 , a steam ship later turned into a training vessel
 , a steam warship
 , an ironclad warship launched by Samuda Brothers of London in 1880 and stricken in 1932
 , a  heavy cruiser, launched in 1929, commissioned into the Argentine Navy in 1931, and decommissioned in 1961

Almirante Brown, ARA